Varicostele is a genus of air-breathing land snails, terrestrial pulmonate gastropod mollusks in the family Streptaxidae.

Distribution 
The distribution of the genus Varicostele includes:
 Central Africa
 Congo Basin
 Uganda (1 species)

Species
Species within the genus Varicostele include:
 Varicostele lessensis Pilsbry, 1919

References

Streptaxidae